The 1967 San Francisco mayoral election was held on November 7, 1967.

Results

References 

1967 California elections
Mayoral elections in San Francisco
1967 United States mayoral elections
1967 in San Francisco